Aerothyris is a genus of brachiopods belonging to the family Terebratellidae.

The species of this genus are found in southernmost South Hemisphere.

Species:

Aerothyris fragilis 
Aerothyris kerguelenensis 
Aerothyris kerguelensis 
Aerothyris macquariensis 
Aerothyris maquariensis

References

Brachiopod genera